The 1995 Philips Open was a men's tennis tournament played on outdoor clay courts at the Nice Lawn Tennis Club in Nice, France, and was part of the ATP World Series of the 1995 ATP Tour. It was the 23rd edition of the tournament and took place from 17 April until 24 April 1995. Fifth-seeded Marc Rosset won the singles title.

Finals

Singles

 Marc Rosset defeated  Yevgeny Kafelnikov 6–4, 6–0
 It was Rosset's 1st singles title of the year and the 10th of his career.

Doubles

 Cyril Suk /  Daniel Vacek defeated  Luke Jensen /  David Wheaton 3–6, 7–6, 7–6

References

External links
 ITF tournament edition details

Philips Open
1995
Philips Open
Philips Open
20th century in Nice